Simulium is a genus of black flies, which may transmit diseases such as onchocerciasis (river blindness). It is a large genus with several hundred species, and 41 subgenera.

The flies are pool feeders. Their saliva, which contains anticoagulants, a number of enzymes and histamine, is mixed with the blood, preventing clotting until it is ingested by the fly. These bites cause localized tissue damage, and if the number of feeding flies is sufficient, their feeding may produce a blood-loss anaemia.

The host's reaction to fly attacks may include systemic illness, allergic reactions or even death, presumably mediated by histamine. In humans, this systemic reaction is known as "black fly fever" and is characterized by headaches, fever, nausea, adenitis, generalized dermatitis, and allergic asthma.

Systematics
Subgenera:

 Afrosimulium Crosskey, 1969
 Anasolen Enderlein, 1930
 Asiosimulium Takaoka & Choochote, 2005
 Aspathia Enderlein, 1935
 Boophthora Enderlein, 1921
 Boreosimulium Rubtsov & Yankovsky, 1982
 Byssodon Enderlein, 1925
 Chirostilbia Enderlein, 1921
 Crosskeyellum Grenier & Bailly-Choumara, 1970
 Daviesellum Takaoka & Adler, 1997
 Ectemnaspis Enderlein, 1934
 Edwardsellum Enderlein, 1921
 Eusimulium Roubaud, 1906
 Freemanellum  Crosskey, 1969
 Gomphostilbia Enderlein, 1921
 Hebridosimulium Grenier & Rageau, 1961
 Hellichiella Rivosecchi & Cardinali, 1975
 Hemicnetha Enderlein, 1934
 Inaequalium Coscarón & Wygodzinsky, 1984
 Inseliellum Rubtsov, 1974
 Lewisellum  Crosskey, 1969
 Meilloniellum  Rubtsov, 1962
 Metomphalus Enderlein, 1935
 Montisimulium  Rubtsov, 1974
 Morops Enderlein, 1930
 Nevermannia Enderlein, 1921
 Notolepria Enderlein, 1930
 Obuchovia  Rubtsov, 1947
 Phoretomyia  Crosskey, 1969
 Pomeroyellum  Rubtsov, 1962
 Psaroniocompsa Enderlein, 1934
 Psilopelmia Enderlein, 1934
 Psilozia Enderlein, 1936
 Pternaspatha Enderlein, 1930
 Rubzovia Petrova, 1983
 Schoenbaueria Enderlein, 1921 
 Simulium Latreille, 1802
 Trichodagmia Enderlein, 1934
 Wallacellum Takaoka, 1983
 Wilhelmia Enderlein, 1921
 Xenosimulium  Crosskey, 1969

Species:
 List of Simulium species

In Balkan folklore
In Serbian mythology there is a legend concerning an ala (demon) (a female entity associated with hailstorms, madness and disease) fabled to have died in a cave near the town of Golubac in the Pozarevac District in Eastern Serbia. The rotting corpse of this being is said to send forth each Spring a swarm of Golubatz flies – individuals of the species Simulium colombaschense. The fact that the Golubatz fly is a voracious bloodsucker and disease vector accords well with the functions attributed to the ala, emphasising her malign potency – even in death – while the legend provides, reciprocally, a folkloric explanation for the genesis of so unpleasant an insect. S. colombaschense was a notorious insect pest of the Banat (part of the Pannonian Basin, bordered to the south by the  Danube), during the 18th century.

References

Bibliography 
 Crosskey R. W. ; The natural history of blackflies. Willey, New York, 1990.  
 Honomichl K. ; Bellmann, H. ; Biologie und Ökologie der Insekten. CD-Rom. Gustav Fischer, Stuttgart, 1994.   
 Jedlicka, L.; Stloukalova V. ; Family Simuliidae. pp. 331–347 in: Papp, L. and Darvas, B. (eds.): Contributions to a Manual of Palaearctic Diptera, Volume 2. Science Herald, Budapest, 1997.
 Jensen, F. ; Diptera Simuliidae, Blackflies. pp. 209–241 in: Nilsson, A.N. (ed.): Aquatic Insects of North Europe. A Taxonomic Handbook. Apollo Books, Stenstrup, 1997.
 Kim, K. C. ; Merritt, R. W. (Eds.) ; Black flies, ecology, population management, and annotat. world list. University Park, London, 1987.  
 Laird, M. (Ed.) ; Blackflies. Academic Press, London, 1981. 
 Lechthaler, W. ; Car, M. ; Simuliidae − Key to Larvae and Pupae from Central− and Western Europe. Vienna 2005, 
 Seitz, G. ; Verbreitung und Ökologie der Kriebelmücken (Diptera: Simuliidae) in Niederbayern. in: Lauterbornia. Mauch, Dinkelscherben 11.1992, pp. 1–230.
 Timm, T. ; Dormanzformen bei Kriebelmücken unter besonderer Berücksichtigung des Ei-Stadiums (Diptera: Simuliidae). in: Entomologia generalis. Schweizerbart, Stuttgart 12.1987, 133-142. 
 Timm, T. ; Unterschiede in Habitatselektion und Eibiologie bei sympatrischen Kriebelmückenarten (Diptera, Simuliidae). in: Mitteilungen der Deutschen Gesellschaft für Allgemeine und Angewandte Entomologie.  Bremen 6.1988, 156-158.  
 Timm, T. ; Rühm, W. (Hrsg.) ; Beiträge zur Taxonomie, Faunistik und Ökologie der Kriebelmücken in Mitteleuropa. Essener Ökologische Schriften. Bd.2. Westarp Wissenschaften, Magdeburg 1993. 
 Wichard, W. ; Arens, W. ; Eisenbeis, G. ; Atlas zur Biologie der Wasserinsekten. Stuttgart, 1994. 
 Wirtz, H. P. ; Analyse der Histaminanteile im Speichel verschiedener Kriebelmückenarten (Diptera: Simuliidae). in: Mitteilungen der Deutschen Gesellschaft für Allgemeine und Angewandte Entomologie.  Bremen 6.1988, 441-442.  

 
Insect vectors of human pathogens
Culicomorpha genera